Collectables by Ashanti is a remix compilation album by American R&B-pop singer Ashanti, released in 2005. It is the last Murder Inc. release to be distributed by Def Jam.

Background
The album, which consists of six remixes of past singles and four new tracks. The album had a parental advisory, but a "clean" version was also released.

Commercial performance
The album debuted and peaked at number 59 on the Billboard 200. The album also became Ashanti's fourth to reach the Top 10 on Billboard's Top R&B/Hip-Hop Albums chart, peaking at number 10. "Still on It", the only single released from the album, was a commercial disappointment, peaking at number 55 on the Hot R&B/Hip Hop Songs chart and failing to enter the Hot 100 altogether.

Critical reception
The album elicited a mixed reaction from music critics upon its release. AllMusic's Andy Kellman was skeptical of the album, noting that it looks "illegit". He went on to call the album "a lukewarm scramble of some of her biggest singles", also commenting that casual fans would be disappointed by the record but awarding the album three stars nonetheless and commending "Still on It" for being "ruggedly sweet" and "I Love You" for being "drama-free".

Track listing
"Still on It" (featuring Paul Wall and Method Man) – 3:49
"Only U" (Remix) (featuring Caddillac Tah, Merce, Ja Rule and Black Child) – 4:12
"I Love You" – 4:22
"Rain on Me" (Remix) (featuring Ja Rule, Charli Baltimore and Hussein Fatal) – 5:15
"Still Down" (Remix) – 4:36
"Show You" – 3:30
"I Found It in You" – 3:36
"Breakup 2 Makeup" (Remix) (featuring Black Child) – 3:44
"Rock wit U (Awww Baby)" (Remix) – 3:52
"Focus" (Remix) (featuring Free) – 3:27

Charts

References

2005 compilation albums
2005 remix albums
Albums produced by Irv Gotti
Ashanti (singer) albums
Def Jam Recordings remix albums
Def Jam Recordings compilation albums